François de la Rivière may refer to:

François Peruçel de la Rivière, 16th century French Protestant
François Byssot de la Rivière (1612–1673), early figure in the New World